Al-Qal3ah, Qal3ah, or Qal3ati (— "the castle"; the 3 is an ASCII representation of the Arabic ) was an Internet forum infamous for being the site of announcements and discussions by Islamic extremists. Postings included several videos of the decapitation of hostages by Abu Musab al-Zarqawi's group in Iraq. The website had upwards of ten mirrors, but all are down as of 23 February 2007. The Islamist-extremist watchdog group Society for Internet Research claim that the forums were owned by the Muslim reformist Sa'ad Al-Faqih (or al-Fagih).
On the same day as the 7 July 2005 London bombings, the Qal3ah forum carried a posting which took responsibility for those bombings.
But on July 9, 2005, The Guardian reported that al-Faqih denied ownership of the site and claimed that the accusation was a "Zionist smear."

Al-Qal3ah was registered in Abu Dhabi, capital of the United Arab Emirates. The site officially distanced itself from terrorist and pro-terrorism activity, maintaining that it was a discussion forum for religious and political views and issues. However, it has been labelled as a cover for a "jihadi forum" by SOFIR. Such claims cite as evidence that Sa'ad Al-Faqih has been identified by the United States Treasury as having financially assisted al-Qaeda. The mirrors' Internet service providers included Everyones Internet and PIPEX.

References

External links
Wayback Machine archive of qal3ah.org

Islamic political websites
Al-Qaeda propaganda